The Chienshan Power Plant is a fuel-fired power plant in Huxi Township, Penghu County, Taiwan. With the total capacity of 140 MW, the power plant is the largest diesel fuel-fired power plant in Taiwan. Chienshan Power Plant is the only major power plant in Penghu Island.

History
In November 1994, the Executive Yuan approved the construction of the power plant. In June 1990, the first phase of the power plant was commissioned with four generation units with a total installed capacity of 10.4 MW. In March 1998, the Executive Yuan approved for the expansion of the power plant on Unit 5–12 with the total installed capacity of 11 MW. The construction of those eight generation units were completed in December 2002.

See also 

 List of power stations in Taiwan
 Electricity sector in Taiwan

References 

2000 establishments in Taiwan
Buildings and structures in Penghu County
Energy infrastructure completed in 2000
Oil-fired power stations in Taiwan